Sarah Lambert Lyall is an American journalist who has worked for The New York Times, including an 18-year period as the title's London correspondent.

Biography
Raised in New York City, Lyall attended the Chapin School and is a graduate of Phillips Exeter Academy, class of 1981 and of Yale University. Lyall married the author and journalist Robert McCrum in 1995.

After 18 years as London correspondent for The New York Times, Lyall returned to New York with the couple's daughters in 2013; Lyall and McCrum have a transatlantic relationship.

She has written about Prosopagnosia, or face-blindness, a condition from which she suffers.

Bibliography
 Lyall, Sarah; The Anglo Files: A Field Guide to the British New York: W. W. Norton, 2008. 
 McCrum, Robert; and Sarah Lyall. My Year Off: Recovering Life After a Stroke. New York: W.W. Norton, 1998.

References

External links
 Recent and archived news articles by Sarah Lyall of The New York Times
  Jonathan Raban review of Lyall's The Anglo Files: A Field Guide to the British from The New York Review of Books

1960s births
Living people
American expatriates in England
Phillips Exeter Academy alumni
Place of birth missing (living people)
The New York Times writers
Yale University alumni
20th-century American journalists